This is an overview of all regular elections held in the Kingdom of Belgium since its independence. This excludes local referendums and special elections (by-elections) that existed before 1919. Municipal elections prior to 1919 are not listed either.

Constituent elections (1830)

Elections to the temporary National Congress:

 3 November 1830

Unitary state (1831–1994)

Elections in 1831–1919 
Representatives were elected for a 4-year term; half of the Chamber was up for election each two years. Senators were elected for an 8-year term; half of the Senate was up for election each four years. The first series (referenced as "E" here) consisted of the provinces of East Flanders, Hainaut, Liège and Limburg; the second series ("A" below) of Antwerp, Brabant, Luxembourg, Namur and West Flanders.

An equivalent system applied to elections for municipal and provincial councils.

Elections in 1919–1994

Federal state (1994–present) 
The 1993–1994 fourth state reform had far-reaching consequences for the institutional structure of the country.

Local elections (six-year terms) include provincial and municipal elections, as well as district elections in Antwerp.

Regional elections (five-year terms, concurrently with European elections) are elections to the different parliaments of communities and regions: the Flemish Parliament, the Walloon Parliament, the Parliament of the Brussels-Capital Region, the Parliament of the German-speaking Community and indirectly the Parliament of the French Community and the three assemblies of the community commissions in Brussels.

Notes

See also 
 Elections in Belgium
 State reform in Belgium

 
Belgium
Elections